Pakistani dramas, or Pakistani serials, are televised serials produced in Pakistan. Although most of the serials are produced in Urdu, an increasing number of them are produced in other Pakistani languages such as Sindhi,  Pashto,  Punjabi and Balochi. One of Pakistan's oldest television dramas is the Urdu serial Khuda Ki Basti, which aired in 1969. Pakistani dramas, like serials elsewhere, reflect the country's culture. According to Farooq Sulehria 1970s & 1980 are  considered to be golden old days of Pakistani serials.

They have helped to attract viewers nationwide to television. The serials are watched in India and are popular in other South Asian countries, including Afghanistan, Bangladesh and Nepal.

Origin 
Many Pakistani dramas are based on Urdu novels and in the subsequent years after 1969, many authors became television writers such as authors Umera Ahmad and Farhat Ishtiaq; both of whom have written content for digests as well as television serials. In recent years, Pakistani dramas have increasingly begun to tackle social issues that are once considered taboos.

Social impact 
Pakistani feminists are usually concerned about depiction of women in Pakistani drama TV serials, they receive many of those with skepticism & reservation.  UK based Pakistani feminist Tasneem Ahmar, whose research institute focuses on the women-media relationships, complaints 99.99% of TV drama in Pakistan is misogynist, patriarchal medieval in its depiction and treatment of women issues. Ahmar says there is no doubt that Pakistani Drama TV serials are hugely popular among all strata of Pakistani society, but unfortunately they waste their potential of doing better in projecting progressive values rather than regressive values vis a vis women's depiction & support to equal rights.

Popularity outside Pakistan

Middle East
In 2013, the Pakistani drama Humsafar was dubbed into Arabic and broadcast by MBC in the Middle East as Rafeeq-Al-Rooh. The show was immediately successful and, after its first few episodes were broadcast, became the channel's most-watched drama. Before this, Pakistani dramas were not broadcast in the Middle East. After Humasafar, other shows such as Malaal (aired as Hob-Wa-Nadam), Zindagi Gulzar Hai (aired as Asrar Al Hob),  Mera Naam Yousuf Hai, Daastan, Kadoorat, Mera Naseeb, Mata-e-Jaan Hai Tu, Noor Bano, Dil-e-Muztar, Khaani, Gul-o-Gulzar, Balaa, Cheekh, Do Bol, Koi Chand Rakh, Aisi Hai Tanhai, and Suno Chanda "Chaudry and Sons" were also dubbed into Arabic and broadcast by MBC.

India
Dramas such as Deewarein, Waris, and Jungle were popular in India during the 1980s, but the Indian government has imposed a ban on Pakistani television channels in India. In 2009, the Senate of Pakistan's broadcasting division appealed to the Parliament of India to lift the ban. In 2012, India began debating whether to reverse the ban on Pakistani television channels. India assured Pakistan that it would consider a proposal by Pakistani foreign secretary Jalil Abbas Jilani to lift the ban.

Zee Entertainment Enterprises (ZEEL) launched an entertainment television channel, Zindagi, on 23 June 2014. The channel aired syndicated television shows from Pakistan, and has been well received. It has been criticized, however, for showing dramas with a smaller number of episodes. To appease viewers, the channel aired Pakistani television shows such as Aunn Zara, Humsafar, Kitni Girhain Baaki Hain, Maat, Meri Zaat Zarra-e-Benishan, Mere Qatil Mere Dildar, Mirat-ul-Uroos, Ullu Baraye Farokht Nahi, Akbari Asghari, Ashk, Azar Ki Ayegi Baraat, Badi Aapa, Pyarey Afzal, Bashar Momin, Behadd, Meray Dard Ko Jo Zuban Miley, Bilqees Kaur, Shehr-e-Zaat, Kadoorat, Mata-e-Jaan Hai Tu, Daagh, Daam, Durr-e-Shehwar, Dil-e-Muztar, Do Qadam Door Thay, Gohar-e-Nayab, Ishq Junoon Deewangi, Ishq Gumshuda, Jab We Wed, Main Abdul Qadir Hoon, Qaid-e-Tanhai, Jackson Heights, Kaash Main Teri Beti Na Hoti, and Zindagi Gulzar Hai. Zindagi Gulzar Hai became so popular that it was re-run one month after it ended its initial run in India. In September 2016,  however, Zindagi dropped all Pakistani shows from their line-up. In this way, Zindagi came to its end on television.

In July 2020, it was announced that Zindagi will make its comeback digitally and brand will come with its 5 original Web Series including Maan Jogi, Abdullah Pur Ka Devdas, Churails, Aik Jhooti Love Story and Dhoop Ki Deewar along with some old and new shows from Zindagi Library.

Blockbuster Pakistani Drama Series Baba Jani, Badi Aapa, Diyar-e-Dil, Mera Naam Yousuf Hai, Mann Mayal, Baaghi, Vasl, Behadd, O Rangreza, Bunty I Love You, Main Abdul Qadir Hoon, Durr-e-Shehwar, Numm, Ullu Baraye Farokht Nahi, Nanhi, Digest Writer, Shehr-e-Zaat, Suno Chanda and many others started to premiere from July 2020 on ZEE5 app with a premium membership.

Star India begin airing of Mera Naam Yousuf Hai in 2015 on their channel Star Plus and thus becoming the channel's first ever Pakistani drama. The series was aired in India, UAE, USA, Ireland, UK, Austria, Europe, Canada and Latin America. Series received extravagant reception in viewership and ratings. 

As per research study of Pakistani popular drama conducted by Indian scholar Jyoti Mehra, north Indian audience gets a sense of cultural familiarity which they can relate to while watching Pakistani drama. The study also gives credit to  the content of Pakistani dramas for its comparative realism with fast pace with shorter duration and limited number of episodes for its acceptability among Indian audience.

2022

Another series Mrs and Mr Shameem starring Saba Qamar and Nauman Ejaz started on ZEE5 app which is attracted to viewers of Pakistan and also other countries like India.

Other countries
Pakistani dramas are shown in Afghanistan, Bangladesh, Nepal. Pakistani television shows are aired on cable television channels in the United Kingdom, Norway, the United States, Canada and Turkey for the Pakistani diaspora.

References

Pakistani popular culture
Television in Pakistan
Asian drama